Elizabeth McBride (May 17, 1955 – June 16, 1997) was an American costume designer. She was nominated for Best Costumes for the film Driving Miss Daisy at the 62nd Academy Awards.

She died at age 42 of cancer.

Selected filmography

The Shawshank Redemption (1994)
Made In America (1993)
Fried Green Tomatoes (1991)
Thelma & Louise (1991)
Driving Miss Daisy (1989)
Tender Mercies (1983)

References

External links

1955 births
1997 deaths
American costume designers
Women costume designers
Deaths from cancer in New Mexico